The following highways are numbered 377:

Brazil
 BR-377

Canada
Saskatchewan Highway 377

Japan
 Japan National Route 377

United States
  U.S. Route 377
  Arizona State Route 377
  Arkansas Highway 377
  Georgia State Route 377
  Hawaii Route 377
  Maryland Route 377 (unsigned)
  Nevada State Route 377
  New York State Route 377
  Ohio State Route 377
  Puerto Rico Highway 377
  South Dakota Highway 377
  Tennessee State Route 377
 Texas:
  Texas State Highway Loop 377 (former)
  Farm to Market Road 377
  Virginia State Route 377
  Wyoming Highway 377